The 2015 FA WSL Cup Final was the fifth final of the FA WSL Cup, England's secondary cup competition for women's football teams and its primary league cup tournament. Arsenal beat Notts County 3-0.

References

Cup
FA Women's Super League Cup finals
FA WSL Cup Final
FA WSL Cup Final, 2015